Brian Keith Banks (born July 24, 1985) is a former American football player. He signed with the Atlanta Falcons of the National Football League (NFL) on April 3, 2013. Banks signed as an undrafted free agent with the Las Vegas Locomotives of the United Football League in 2012.

Banks was a standout high school football star at Polytechnic High School (Poly) in Long Beach, California. In 2002, his Junior year, Banks verbally committed to USC. After being falsely accused of rape by classmate Wanetta Gibson, he spent close to six years imprisoned and five years on parole. In 2012, his conviction was overturned when his accuser confessed that she had fabricated the entire story. Following his exoneration, Banks sought to resume his football career, playing for the now-defunct United Football League (UFL), attending mini-camps for several NFL teams, and later signing with the Atlanta Falcons.

High school career
A native of Long Beach, California, Banks attended Long Beach Polytechnic High School, where he was teammates with DeSean Jackson, Darnell Bing, Winston Justice, and Marcedes Lewis. He was named one of Rivals.com's "Juniors to Watch" of the class of 2003. He was expelled from school due to a rape accusation that was later proven to be false.

Professional career
In the summer of 2012, Banks received tryouts with several NFL teams, including the Kansas City Chiefs, San Diego Chargers, and San Francisco 49ers. He attended minicamp with the Seattle Seahawks, whose head coach, Pete Carroll, had offered Banks a scholarship in 2002 when he was head coach at USC.

Las Vegas Locomotives
Banks signed with the Las Vegas Locomotives of the UFL on September 20, 2012, appearing in two games–his first meaningful game action since playing in his last high school game more than 11 years earlier. He made one tackle before the UFL suspended its season in October.

Atlanta Falcons
Banks signed with the Atlanta Falcons on April 3, 2013, participating in offseason workouts, OTAs, and training camp. Banks made his NFL debut in a preseason game against the Cincinnati Bengals, where he picked up two tackles. He played four preseason games with the Falcons before being released on August 30, 2013.

National Football League (NFL)

In 2014, Banks was asked by NFL Commissioner Roger Goodell to speak at the 2014 NFL draft Rookie Symposium. Banks accepted and his speech was well received. A few weeks later, he was hired to join the NFL Department of Operations.

Personal life
In May 2015, Banks married Emmy Marino. They had no children and filed for divorce in February 2017.

False accusation of sexual assault 

In the summer of 2002, aged 16, Banks was arrested and charged after classmate Wanetta Gibson falsely accused him of dragging her into a stairway and raping her. He was expelled from Long Beach Polytechnic High School right after being taken into custody and placed at Juvenile Hall. Shawn Ashley, who was a co-principal of Long Beach Poly High had claimed that Banks would not be allowed back on campus regardless of any jurisdictional outcome. Faced with a possible 41 years to life sentence, he accepted a plea bargain that included five years in prison, five years of probation, and registering as a sex offender. Banks says that his lawyer said that by pleading no contest he would receive probation, but no jail time. 

Gibson and her mother Wanda Rhodes sued the Long Beach Unified School District, claiming the Poly campus was not a safe environment, and won a $1.5 million settlement.

Confession of false accusation 

In March 2011, Gibson contacted Banks on Facebook, met with him, and admitted in the presence of a private investigator Banks had hired that she had fabricated the story. Banks secretly recorded Gibson's confession, but she later refused to tell prosecutors that she had lied. According to Banks and his private investigator, Gibson refused to tell prosecutors that she had lied, so that she wouldn’t have to return the money she and her family had won in court.

California Innocence Project 

Prior to the taped confession, Banks had asked for help from the California Innocence Project (CIP), a nonprofit law school clinic run by the San Diego-based California Western School of Law that investigates and litigates cases of actual innocence. At that time, however, there had not been sufficient evidence of Banks's innocence for them to take on the case. However, after the confession, CIP decided to make it the organization's first case involving a wrongfully convicted person who had already been released from prison.

The video evidence was not admissible in court because the video had been made without Gibson's knowledge or consent and was not accompanied by a signed confession from her. However, CIP was instrumental in putting together additional evidence supporting Banks' story, which led the district attorney to ask the judge to reverse the conviction on May 24, 2012. Banks was also relieved of his record as a sex offender, allowing him to resume his sports career.

Banks supports CIP in its efforts on behalf of the wrongly convicted, participating in CIP's 2013 Innocence March.

School lawsuit 

In 2013, the Long Beach Unified School District won a $2.6 million judgment against Gibson, recouping $750,000 in payments paid to her along with attorney's fees, interest, and $1 million in punitive damages; Gibson failed to appear in court.

Film adaptation
A feature film project based on Banks' story, co-executive produced by Banks and Justin Brooks of CIP, premiered in 2018 and was released in August 2019. It is directed by Tom Shadyac and features Aldis Hodge as Banks, Greg Kinnear as Brooks and Tiffany Dupont as CIP attorney Alissa Bjerkhoel.

See also
List of wrongful convictions in the United States

References

External links
Atlanta Falcons bio
Las Vegas Locomotives bio
Just Sports Stats

1985 births
Living people
American football linebackers
Las Vegas Locomotives players
Atlanta Falcons players
Players of American football from Long Beach, California
Overturned convictions in the United States
People wrongfully convicted of rape
Prisoners and detainees of California
Long Beach City Vikings football players
Long Beach Polytechnic High School alumni